Acadia Valley is a hamlet in southeast Alberta, Canada within the Municipal District (MD) of Acadia No. 34. The MD of Acadia No. 34's municipal office is located in Acadia Valley.

The hamlet is located within census division No. 4. It was named in 1910 by settlers from Nova Scotia.

Demographics 

Attractions 
 Prairie Elevator Museum
 Acadia Municipal Recreation Dam - trout fishing

See also 
List of communities in Alberta
List of designated places in Alberta
List of hamlets in Alberta

References

External links 
Hamlet of Acadia Valley from the M.D. of Acadia No. 34 official web site

Municipal District of Acadia No. 34
Hamlets in Alberta
Designated places in Alberta